Elfdalian or Övdalian ( or , pronounced  in Elfdalian,  or  in Swedish) is a North Germanic language spoken by up to 3,000 people who live or have grown up in the locality of Älvdalen, which is located in the southeastern part of Älvdalen Municipality in northern Dalarna, Sweden.

Like all other modern North Germanic languages, Elfdalian developed from Old Norse, a North Germanic language that was spoken by inhabitants of Scandinavia and inhabitants of their overseas settlements during the Viking Age until about 1300. It has developed in relative isolation since the Middle Ages and is considered to have remained closer to Old Norse than the other Dalecarlian dialects.

Traditionally regarded as a Swedish dialect, but by several criteria closer to West Scandinavian dialects, Elfdalian is a separate language by the standard of mutual intelligibility. Although there is low mutual intelligibility between Swedish and Elfdalian, because education and public administration in Älvdalen are conducted in Swedish, native speakers are bilingual and speak Swedish at a native level. Residents in the area having Swedish as their sole native language, neither speaking nor understanding Elfdalian, are also common.

Classification
Elfdalian belongs to the Northern branch/Upper Siljan branch of the Dalecarlian dialects or vernaculars, which in their turn evolved from Old Norse, from which Dalecarlian vernaculars might have split as early as in the eighth or ninth century, i.e., approximately when the North Germanic languages split into Western and Eastern branches. 
Elfdalian (and other Dalecarlian language varieties) is traditionally placed among the East Scandinavian languages, together with Swedish and Danish, based on a number of features that Elfdalian has in common with them. According to Lars Levander, some of the West Scandinavian features that simultaneously do occur in Elfdalian are archaic traits that once were common in many Scandinavian dialects and have been preserved in the most conservative tongues east and west of Kölen. However, this is rebutted by Kroonen.

Characteristics

Archaisms
 Lack of syllable lengthening.
 Retention of nominative, accusative and dative cases.
 Retention of Proto-Germanic, Proto-Norse and Old Norse nasal vowels.
Retention of consonant clusters ld, nd, mb, rg, gd and ng (with audible ), as in ungg ('young'), kweld ('evening'), warg ('wolf') and lamb ('lamb') from Old Norse ungʀ, kveld, vargʀ (both with  represented by 'v') and lamb.

Innovations and unique developments
 More frequent assimilation of pre-Norse mp, nt, and nk to pp, tt, and kk, as in West Scandinavian dialects.
 Shift of a to o before Pre-Norse nk (but not kk).
 Shift of Old Norse ei, ey, and au to ie, ä, and o.
 Diphthongization of Old Norse long high vowels í, ý, ú to closing diphthongs ai, åy, au, and of long rounded mid vowels ó, œ to opening diphthongs uo, yö.
 Vowel harmony (present also in other dialects of Central Scandinavia).
 Loss of h: compare Elfdalian  with Swedish  (or English house) and Elfdalian  with Swedish .

Phonology
Elfdalian is comparable to Swedish and Norwegian in the number and the quality of vowels but also has nasal vowels. It has retained the Old Norse dental, velar and labial voiced fricatives. Alveolo-palatal affricate consonants occur in all  (Swedish , north of Siljan) dialects. Unlike many variants of Norwegian and Swedish, Elfdalian does not assimilate  into retroflex consonants. The stress is generally on the first syllable of a word.

Consonants 

 Sounds  are released as apico-alveolar.

Vowels 

 Sounds  are heard primarily in Övdaln, whereas  are heard in other parts nearby.

Diphthongs 

  is realized in some village dialects .

Nasal vowel sounds
Elfdalian has nasal versions of most vowels. They have several origins, belonging to different layers of history, but most involve the loss of a nasal consonant, with lengthening and nasalisation of a preceding vowel. 
 Late Proto-Germanic loss of *n before *h, which was lost in early Norse, but the nasalisation remained:  "doorway" (Proto-Germanic ).
 Old Norse loss of nasal consonants before *s:  "goose" (Proto-Germanic ),  "lard".
 Old Norse loss of *n before *l and *r:  "our" (Proto-Norse ).
 Old Norse loss of word-final *n but only monosyllables:  "on" (Proto-Germanic ),  "to see" (Proto-Germanic ),  "two (accusative)" (Proto-Germanic ) and the prefix  "un-" (Proto-Germanic ).
 Central Scandinavian loss of word-final -n if it had been preserved in Old Norse generally; The change affected neither Standard Swedish, nor final geminate -nn. The shift occurred in primarily the definite noun suffix of feminine nouns but also  "she" and a few other words.
 Secondary post-Norse loss of n before s:  "to wash",  "left" (Old Norse  with /w/-sound)
 Spontaneous (non-etymological) nasality:  "to travel" (from ),  "cheese" (from ).
 Before nasal consonants. This case of nasalisation is allophonic and is not indicated in the orthography.
Nasal vowels are quite rare in Nordic languages, and Elfdalian and a few other neighbouring Dalecarlian dialects are the only ones that preserve nasal vowels from Proto-Norse; all other Nordic dialects with nasal vowels have developed them later as a result of the loss of a nasal consonant: compare Kalix dialect hąt and gås with Elfdalian hand and gą̊s.

Grammar
In common with some other Dalecarlian vernaculars spoken north of Lake Siljan, Elfdalian retains numerous old grammatical and phonological features that have not changed considerably since Old Norse. Elfdalian is thus considered to be the most conservative and best preserved vernacular in the Dalecarlian branch. Having developed in relative isolation since the Middle Ages, many linguistic innovations also present occur.

Morphology
Elfdalian has a morphological structure inherited from its Old Norse ancestor. Verbs are conjugated according to person and number and nouns have four cases, like Modern Icelandic and German. The Old Norse three-gender system has been retained. Like the other North Germanic languages, nouns have definite and indefinite forms, rather than a separate definite article (as in English). The length of the root syllable plays a major role in the Elfdalian declensional and conjugational system.

The distinction between nominative and accusative has been lost in full nouns, and the inherited genitive been replaced by new forms created by attaching  to the dative (see Dahl & Koptjevskaja-Tamm 2005), a trend that was well underway even in Classic Elfdalian.

Syntax
Unlike other Swedish vernaculars, the syntax of Elfdalian was investigated in the early 20th century (Levander 1909). Although Elfdalian syntax has attracted increased attention, a majority of its syntactic elements are still unresearched. In May–June 2007, a group of linguists from the pan-Scandinavian NORMS network conducted fieldwork in Älvdalen especially aimed at investigating the syntactic properties of the language.

Presented with the help of generative syntax, the following features have been identified:

 Only first- and second-person plural pronouns (Rosenkvist 2006, 2010) can be dropped grammatically.
 First-person plural pronouns may be dropped only if they appear directly in front of the finite verb. Verb raising occurs, but there is variation between generations (Garbacz 2006, 2010).
 Multiple subjects seem to occur in clauses with the adverbial , "actually", or the verb  "is possible" (Levander 1909:109).

 
 literally: "You are  you very good speak-Övdalian"
 "You are actually very good at speaking Övdalian"

That has recently been studied more closely from a generative perspective by Rosenkvist (2007).

Other syntactic properties are negative concord, stylistic inversion, long distance reflexives, verb controlled datives, agent-verb word order in coordinated clauses with deleted subjects, etc. Some of the properties are archaic features that existed in Old Swedish, but others are innovations, but none of them has been studied in any detail.

Writing systems

In Älvdalen, Germanic runes survived in use longer than anywhere else. The last record of the Elfdalian Runes is from 1929; they are a variant of the Dalecarlian runes. Älvdalen can be said to have had its own alphabet during the 17th and 18th century.

Due to the great phonetic differences between Swedish and Elfdalian, the use of Swedish orthography for Elfdalian has been unpredictable and varied, such as the one applied in the Prytz's play from 1622, which contains long passages in Elfdalian, or in the Elfdalian material published in the periodical Skansvakten.

A first attempt to create a separate Elfdalian orthography was made in 1999 by Bengt Åkerberg. Åkerberg's orthography was applied in some books and used in language courses and is based on Loka dialect and is highly phonetic. It has many diacritics (Sapir 2006).

Råðdjärum's orthography
"Let us speak Dalecarlian"), The Organization for the Preservation of Elfdalian. The new orthography has already been applied by Björn Rehnström in his book  'Three Bears from Älvdalen' published in 2007. Råðdjärum's orthography was also used in Bo Westling's translation of 's The Little Prince, .

Elfdalian alphabet

The Elfdalian alphabet consists of the following letters

Other than the letters occurring in the Swedish alphabet, Elfdalian has letters with ogonek, denoting nasal vowels: Ąą, Ęę, Įį, Ųų, Y̨y̨ and Ą̊ą̊. Additionally, it uses the letter eth for the voiced dental fricative.

Language status

As of 2009, Elfdalian had around 2,000 speakers and is in danger of language death. However, it is possible that it will receive an official status as a minority language in Sweden, which would entail numerous protections and encourage its use in schools and by writers and artists. The Swedish Parliament was due to address the issue in 2007, but apparently has not yet done so. The Council of Europe has urged the Swedish government to reconsider the status of Elfdalian on four occasions, most recently in October 2011. The Committee of Experts now encourages the Swedish authorities to investigate the status of Elfdalian through an independent scientific study. In 2020, the Committee of Experts concluded that Elfdalian fulfils the criteria of a Part II language, and asked the Swedish authorities to include reporting on Elfdalian in its next periodical report as the language covered by Part II of the Charter.

Preservation and standardization
, The Organization for the Preservation of Elfdalian, was established in 1984 with the aim of preserving and documenting the Elfdalian language. In 2005,  launched a process aimed at bringing about an official recognition of Elfdalian as a language by the Swedish authorities.

, The Elfdalian Language Committee was established in August 2004 within , its first task being to create a new standard orthography for Elfdalian.

An online version of Lars Steensland's 2010 Elfdalian dictionary was published in September 2015.

In March 2016, Swedish Radio reported that the Älvdalen City Council had decided that, starting in autumn 2016, the local kindergarten would operate solely through the medium of Elfdalian.

New organisms named after Elfdalian
In 2015, a new genus Elfdaliana of deep-sea nudibranch molluscs was named after the Elfdalian language in reference to evolutionary basal characters of the new genus never before reported for the family, just as Elfdalian preserves ancestral features of Old Norse.

Notes

References

Dahl, Östen and Maria Koptjevskaja-Tamm. 2005. The resilient dative and other remarkable cases in Scandinavian vernaculars. Ms. University of Stockholm.
Garbacz, Piotr (2008). Älvdalska – ett mindre känt nordiskt språk. s. 1. Oslo universitet
 Nationalencyklopedin, entry älvdalsmål, subentry Dalarna
Sapir, Yair. 2006. Elfdalian, the Vernacular of Övdaln In: Rapport från första konferensen om älvdalska (Report from the First Conference about Elfdalian), Gunnar Nyström (ed.).
Garbacz, Piotr. 2006.Verb movement and negation in Övdalian. Working Papers in Scandinavian Syntax 78: 173–190. (PDF)
Levander, Lars. 1925. Dalmålet. Beskrivning och historia.
Levander, Lars. 1909. Älvdalsmålet i Dalarna (Doctoral thesis published in Svenska landsmål, 1909, (105).
Rosenkvist, Henrik. 2006. Null Subjects in Övdalian. Working Papers in Scandinavian Syntax 78:141–171.
Rosenkvist, Henrik. 2007. Subject Doubling in Oevdalian. Working Papers in Scandinavian Syntax 80:77–102.
Rosenkvist, Henrik. 2010. Null referential subjects in Övdalian. Nordic Journal of Linguistics 33.3:231–267.
Garbacz, Piotr. 2010. 2008a. Bisatsledföljden i älvdalska. In Jóhannesson, K. et al. (eds.) Nog ordat? Festskrift till Sven-Göran Malmgren den 25 April 2008. 105–112. Meijebergs institut för svensk etymologisk forskning.
Garbacz, P. 2008b. Negationens syntax i älvdalskan. In Bukowski, P. et al. (eds.) Perspektiv på svenska språket och litteraturen 193–202. Kraków: Wydawnictwo Uniwersytetu Jagiellońskiego.
Garbacz, Piotr. 2010. Word Order in Övdalian. A Study in Variation and Change. Lundastudier i nordisk språkvetenskap 70. Lund University. (PDF)
Melerska, Dorota. 2010. Vem är ”en riktig älvdaling”? Identitetsmarkörer i dagens Älvdalen. Folia Scandinavica Posnaniensia, vol. 11, 2010, pp. 123–133 (PDF)
Melerska, Dorota. 2011. Älvdalskan – mellan språkdöd och revitalisering. PhD-thesis. Adam Mickiewicz University (PDF)

English
 
 
 Omniglot: Elfdalian alphabet
 Yair Sapir: Elfdalian, the Vernacular of Övdaln – an article with an outline of Elfdalian (history, background, linguistic features, present
 Guus Kroonen: Fight on to preserve Elfdalian
 The Last Elfdalians, BBC Sounds

Swedish
 Elfdalian-swedish dictionary
 Förslag till en enhetlig stavning för älvdalska ("Project for a unified orthography for Elfdalian").
 Volume of The First Conference on Elfdalian / , with English summaries
 Volume of The Second Conference on Elfdalian / , with English summaries
 SOFI the Institute for Language and Folklore – Älvdalen
 Mikael Parkvall, Sveriges språk. Vem talar vad och var?. RAPPLING 1. Rapporter från Institutionen för lingvistik vid Stockholms universitet. 2009 , pp. 29–72

Dalarna
North Germanic languages
Swedish dialects
Languages of Sweden